Resting stage may refer to:

 The diapause stage of a butterfly egg
 Telogen phase, a phase of hair follicle growth
 A phase of cell cycle regulation in eukaryotic DNA replication
 The pupal phase of insect metamorphosis

See also
 Resting spore
 G0 phase or resting phase